Botryococcenes are the major oil constituents of the green algae Botryococcus braunii. The hydrocarbons these species produce can be chemically converted into fuels. 

Transesterification cannot be used to make biodiesel from botryococcenes, the major oil of Botryococcus braunii. This is because Botryococcene oil is not a  'vegetable oil' (which is a fatty acid triglyceride) but is instead a triterpene, and lacks the free oxygen for transesterification. It can be used as feedstock for hydrocracking in an oil refinery to produce octane (gasoline, a.k.a. petrol), and kerosene. Up to 86% of its dry weight can be long-chain hydrocarbons.

Challenges
There are several challenges which must be met in order to economically produce the desired alkanes such as gasoline. This will only be briefly covered in this article at this time, as it has only just begun.

Suitable strain
First, a suitable strain of Bb (Botryococcus braunii) must be found. Several strains are available from algae specimen banks, but there is no guarantee that these are high-producing strains. Some plant patent applications have been filed and patents granted, for high producing strains. It is not likely within reason for even a small scale producer of boytrococcenes to breed successively higher producing strains of Bb, due to the reasonably slow generation rate. However, in selecting Bb strains for high Botryococcene production, it is likely that other beneficial attributes may be bred out. For instance, resistance to disease, competitive advantages against other organisms, and survivability in less than ideal climates. In this case, a photobioreactor may be needed. Botryococcus Braunii are relatively cosmopolitan so this is not a major factor.

The practice of farming algae is known as algaculture. However, there are properties of Botryococcus braunii which make its harvest a bit different from the harvest of other algae. Compared to other green algae species it has a relatively thick cell wall that is accumulated from previous cellular divisions; making extraction of cytoplasmic components rather difficult. Fortunately, much of the useful hydrocarbon oil is outside of the cell. This gives rise to the hope that the algae will not have to be killed in order to extract its useful oil. Several methods are available to extract the botryococcene. One that shows the most promise is the use of hexane as a solvent. If used at the proper molarity, it does not kill the majority of the Bb, while extracting the botryococcene.

See also 
 Botryococcene
 Green crude

External links 
 Japanese scientists create diesel-producing Botryococcus braunii algae.

Algae biofuels